William McLaughlin Taylor Jr. (February 7, 1909 – June 17, 1985) was a United States district judge of the United States District Court for the Northern District of Texas.

Education and career

Born in Denton, Texas, Taylor's father, William M. Taylor, was an attorney who would go on to serve on the Supreme Court of Texas. Taylor received a Bachelor of Laws from Southern Methodist University School of Law in 1932. He was in private practice from 1932 to 1933, and was then an assistant district attorney of the Civil Department of the State of Texas from 1933 to 1936, and an assistant city attorney from 1936 to 1939. He returned to private practice in Dallas, Texas from 1939 to 1946. He was a Reserve Captain in the United States Marine Corps during World War II, from 1944 to 1945, again returning to private practice in Dallas from 1946 to 1949. He was a judge of the 134th District Court of Dallas County, Texas from 1949 to 1953. He was again in private practice in Dallas from 1953 to 1966.

Federal judicial service

On June 28, 1966, Taylor was nominated by President Lyndon B. Johnson to a seat on the United States District Court for the Northern District of Texas vacated by Judge Thomas Whitfield Davidson. Taylor was confirmed by the United States Senate on July 22, 1966, and received his commission the same day. He served as Chief Judge from 1973 to 1977, assuming senior status on February 7, 1979, and serving in that capacity until his death on June 17, 1985.

References

1909 births
1985 deaths
Judges of the United States District Court for the Northern District of Texas
United States district court judges appointed by Lyndon B. Johnson
20th-century American judges
United States Marine Corps officers